Olzhas Omaruly Suleimenov (Oljas Omarūly Süleimenov; , Olzhas Omarovich Suleymenov) is a Kazakh former Soviet dissident, Russian-language poet, Turkologist, politician, and anti-nuclear activist.

Life
Suleimenov was born to a Muslim family as the son of Omar Suleimenov on 18 May 1936 in Alma-Ata. He graduated from Geological Sciences Department of Kazakh State University in 1959. Suleimenov also finished Maxim Gorky Literature Institute in 1961. Between 1962-1971, he worked at Kazakhskaya Pravda. Suleimenov was awarded Komsomol Prize for Kazakhstan in 1966. Between 1969 and 1989 he was a member of the Communist Party of the Soviet Union. In 1981 he was a member of the jury at the 12th Moscow International Film Festival. He became First Secretary of the Committee of the Kazakhstan's Writers Union in 1983. He is a Russophone writer.

Works
His most influential work, AZ-and-IA, was published in 1975. The book is about the possible Turkic origin of the Russian chronicle The Tale of Igor's Campaign. AZ-i-IA drew widespread criticism from the literary elite in Russia. Suleimenov was charged with "national chauvinism" and "glorifying feudal nomadic culture." Kazakhstan Communist Party first secretary  Dinmuhammad Konayev intervened on Suleimenov's behalf, discussing the content of the book with Leonid Brezhnev and saving Suleimenov's career.
His other works include:
Argamaki (1961)
Zemlia Poklonis' Cheloveku (1961)
Solnechnye Nochi (1962)
Dobroe Vremia Voskhoda (1964)
God Obez'iany (1967)
Glinianaia Kniga (1969)

Political activities

Suleimenov again became a worldwide name in 1989, when he led the establishment of the international environmental movement Nevada-Semipalatinsk. Nevada-Semipalatinsk campaigned to close nuclear sites in Nevada and in the Semipalatinsk Oblast of Kazakhstan. 

After independence, Suleimenov established the People's Congress of Kazakhstan party in 1991 and served as the speaker of Parliament from 1993 until 1994. While at the Parliament, he rose to the position of opposition leader, engaging in several political struggles with President Nursultan Nazarbaev. Many opposition leaders urged him to run as a candidate in the next presidential elections.

In 1995, to preempt his potential candidacy, Nazarbayev brokered a deal, and Suleimenov was appointed as Kazakhstan's ambassador to Rome. Since 2002 he serves as Kazakhstani ambassador at the UNESCO in Paris.

On February 4, 2023, he was elected Chairman of the International Democratic Party People's Congress of Kazakhstan.

See also 
Douglas Mackiernan
List of nuclear weapons tests
Soviet atomic bomb project
Nuclear weapons testing
Novaya Zemlya
Andrei Sakharov

References

Russian-language poets
1936 births
Living people
Communist Party of Kazakhstan politicians
Ambassadors of Kazakhstan to Italy
Ambassadors of Kazakhstan to Greece
Ambassadors of Kazakhstan to Malta
Permanent Delegates of Kazakhstan to UNESCO
Chairmen of the Mazhilis
Kazakhstani historians
Soviet anti–nuclear weapons activists
Al-Farabi Kazakh National University alumni
Tengrist religious workers
Maxim Gorky Literature Institute alumni